The sixth edition of the annual Four Hills Tournament in Germany and Austria was won by East German athlete Helmut Recknagel, who won on both Austrian hills. It was his first of three tournament victories within four years.

Participating nations and athletes

Results

Oberstdorf
 Schattenbergschanze, Oberstdorf
29 December 1957

Garmisch-Partenkirchen
 Große Olympiaschanze, Garmisch-Partenkirchen
1 January 1958

Two jumpers who placed on the podium of Oberstdorf only three days prior placed poorly in Garmisch-Partenkirchen, falling back in the overall ranking: Helmut Recknagel finished 35th (189.1p), Walter Habersatter 42nd (183.6p).

Innsbruck
 Bergiselschanze, Innsbruck
5 January 1958

Bischofshofen
 Paul-Ausserleitner-Schanze, Bischofshofen
6 January 1958

Leading 8.6 points ahead of Schamov, Nikolay Kamenskiy was in a promising position to become the first ski jumper to win the Four Hills Tournament twice after his success two years prior.

However, Kamenskiy classified in a disappointing 18th place. Helmut Recknagel, who was only fifth in the overall ranking prior to Bischofshofen, won the event and snatched tournament victory.

Final ranking

References

External links
 FIS website
 Four Hills Tournament web site

Four Hills Tournament
1957 in ski jumping
1958 in ski jumping